The Day is a 1914 Australian silent film directed by Alfred Rolfe. It is a propaganda film about German brutality in Europe during World War I. It is considered a lost film.

Production
The Fraser brothers were two distributors and exhibitors who occasionally dabbled in production. They had just made a number of films with Raymond Longford but he had left and Alfred Rolfe became their in-house director instead.

The script was adapted from a popular poem by railway porter Henry Chappell. The screenplay was written by actor Johnson Weir. Weir would recite the poem during screenings.

Actor Jame Martin played a Belgian civilian attacked by two German soldiers. During filming he was struck by a bayonet and had to be treated at St Vincents Hospital.

The Referee wrote that the film " is a theme patriotic from opening to end, and it promises to prove a crowded house magnet."

References

External links
 
The Day at National Film and Sound Archive
 Text of the poem by Henry Chappell
The Day at AustLit

Australian black-and-white films
Australian silent films
Lost Australian films
Films directed by Alfred Rolfe
1914 films